The 1903–04 FA Cup was the 33rd season of the world's oldest association football competition, the Football Association Challenge Cup (more usually known as the FA Cup). Manchester City won the competition for the first time, beating Bolton Wanderers 1–0 in the final at Crystal Palace, through a goal scored by Billy Meredith.

Matches were scheduled to be played at the stadium of the team named first on the date specified for each round, which was always a Saturday. If scores were level after 90 minutes had been played, a replay would take place at the stadium of the second-named team later the same week. If the replayed match was drawn further replays would be held at neutral venues until a winner was determined. If scores were level after 90 minutes had been played in a replay, a 30-minute period of extra time would be played.

Calendar
The format of the FA Cup for the season had two preliminary rounds, five qualifying rounds, an intermediate round, three proper rounds, and the semi finals and final.

Intermediate round

The Intermediate Round featured ten games, played between the ten winners of the fifth qualifying round, and ten teams given byes. Manchester United, Bristol City, Preston North End, Woolwich Arsenal, Barnsley and Grimsby Town from the Second Division were entered automatically into this round, as were non-league Reading, Bristol Rovers and New Brompton.

The other Second Division sides had to gain entry to this round through the earlier qualifying rounds. Burton United and Bradford City were entered at the first qualifying round stage, with Bradford going out in the fourth qualifying round. Glossop were entered at the second qualifying round, but a walkover was awarded to their opponents, Heywood. The others, Blackpool, Burnley, Burslem Port Vale, Chesterfield, Gainsborough Trinity, Leicester Fosse, Lincoln City and Stockport County were entered at the third qualifying round stage, with only Gainsborough and Burslem Port Vale reaching the intermediate round from these.

The ten matches were played on 12 December 1903. Four matches went to replays, with two of these going to a second replay and one of these, the Manchester United – Small Heath game, then went to a third replay.

First round proper
The first round proper contained sixteen ties between 32 teams. 17 of the 18 First Division sides were given a bye to this round, as were Bolton Wanderers from the Second Division, and non-league Southampton, Portsmouth, Millwall Athletic and Tottenham Hotspur. They joined the ten teams who won in the intermediate round.

The matches were played on Saturday, 6 February 1904. Four matches were drawn, with the replays taking place in the following midweek fixture.

Second pound proper
The eight Second Round matches were scheduled for Saturday, 20 February 1904. There was one replay, between Derby County and Wolverhampton Wanderers, played in the following midweek fixture, but this was again drawn and went to a second replay the following week.

Third round proper
The four Third Round matches were scheduled for Saturday, 5 March 1904. Two matches were drawn and replayed in the following midweek fixture.

Semi-finals

The semi-final matches were played on Saturday, 19 March 1904.

Final

The Final, the first all-Lancashire final since the start of the competition, took place at Crystal Palace on Saturday 23 April 1904. The 32nd FA Cup final was contested between Manchester City and Bolton Wanderers. Manchester City won 1–0. The goal was scored by Billy Meredith.

Match details

See also
FA Cup Final Results 1872-

References
General
Official site; fixtures and results service at TheFA.com
1903-04 FA Cup at rsssf.com
1903-04 FA Cup at soccerbase.com

Specific

1903-04
1903–04 in English football
FA